Sarmad Sultan Khoosat (born May 7, 1979) is a Pakistani actor, film/TV director, producer and screenwriter best known for directing the super-hit TV dramas Humsafar and Shehr-e-Zaat. He is considered to be one of the best South Asian filmmakers with his film Zindagi Tamasha being selected as Pakistan's entry for the Best International Feature Film at the 93rd Academy Awards.
The film also premiered at the 24th Busan International Film Festival under the section 'A Window on Asian Cinema'. He also portrayed the role of Saadat Hasan Manto in his film Manto.

Family
He is the son of veteran TV and film actor, producer and comedian Irfan Khoosat, while his sister Kanwal Khoosat is also a director, screenwriter and actress.

Early life and career
Academically, he graduated from Government College University (Lahore) and earned a master's degree in Psychology and a gold medal. He also was a member of the Debating Society of GCU.

He rose to prominence during the late 1990s, when he created the sitcom Shashlik which ran for over three years on PTV. Sarmad directed the series of Tele-films for Geo Tv "TAMASHA GHAR" in 2003 with the screenwriter Saji Gul which was based on themes dealing with subconscious desires and fears (inspired by Freudian school of psychology). 

His first television drama as a director was Piya Naam Ka Diya in 2007, in which he acted opposite filmstar Saima Noor and Erum Akhtar. Sarmad then served as executive director for a soap serial named Mujhe Apna Naam-o-Nishan Milay, directed by his sister Kanwal Khoosat. Khoosat's TV  drama, Kalmoohi that he wrote and directed, began airing on PTV in early 2010, also got good reviews. In 2011, he gained significant prominence and acclaim with the TV drama Pani Jaisa Piyar that aired on Hum TV. It won him the best director award for it on LUX Style Awards. He directed Jal Pari, which was aired on Geo TV. He went on to direct Humsafar for Hum TV, which became an overnight success. His serial Shehr-e-Zaat was especially popular with women.

He conducted a workshop at the Lahore University of Management Sciences's annual amateur film festival in June 2011.

Khoosat directed episodes for Faseele Jaan Se Aagay and Ashk. He also directed the remake of the original Pakistani film, Aina, as a telefilm. In 2015, he completed shooting Mein Manto.

In October 2018, he delivered a 24-hour-long live act, No Time To Sleep, enacting the last 24 hours of a death row prisoner's life, a performance which earned him critical appreciation.

He wrote the script for Saqib Malik's upcoming production Ajnabee Sheher Main, while he has two upcoming feature films as director, writing one as well. His feature film, "Zindagi Tamasha" won the Kim Jin Seok award at the Busan Film Festival 2019 as well as the Best Film and Best Actor at the Asian Film Festival 2021. Despite its critical acclaim, his film release was halted in 2020 by the notorious party, TLP which called for it to be censored. Although the film was cleared for release by Pakistani authorities, Khoosat continued to receive death threats calling for the film to be banned. He took to social media to pen a letter to the government of Pakistan and Imran Khan, the Prime Minister-calling for  protection against the threats. However, the government halted the release and instead invited TLP members to review the film. COVID-19 and the eventual lockdown further halted cinematic releases. Although the film was selected to represent Pakistan at the Oscars, its release remains a mystery.

Filmography

Television

Webseries

Telefilms

Films

Awards and recognition
 Pride of Performance Award in 2017 by the President of Pakistan

See also 
 List of Lollywood actors

References 
Sarmad Khoosat Film .

External links
 

1979 births
Living people
Punjabi people
Pakistani television directors
Urdu film producers
Pakistani male television actors
Pakistani film directors
Pakistani male film actors
Pakistani screenwriters
Pakistani dramatists and playwrights
People from Lahore
Recipients of the Pride of Performance